Aqa Beyk (also Romanized as Āqā Beyk; also known as Āqā Beyg) is a village in Karaftu Rural District, in the Central District of Takab County, West Azerbaijan Province, Iran. At the 2006 census, its population was 139, in 27 families.

References 

Populated places in Takab County